Date or dates  may refer to:

Date (fruit), the fruit of the date palm (Phoenix dactylifera)

Social activity 
Dating, a form of courtship involving social activity, with the aim of assessing a potential partner
Group dating
Play date, an appointment for children to get together for a few hours
Meeting, when two or more people come together

Chronology
Calendar date, a day on a calendar
 Old Style and New Style dates, from before and after the change from the Julian calendar to the Gregorian calendar
 ISO 8601, an international standard covering date formats
Date (metadata), a representation term to specify a calendar date
DATE command, a system time command for displaying the current date
Chronological dating, attributing to an object or event a date in the past
Radiometric dating, dating materials such as rocks in which trace radioactive impurities were incorporated when they were formed

Arts, entertainment and media

Music 
Date (band), a Swedish dansband
"Date" (song), a 2009 song from Mr. Houston
Date Records, a subsidiary of Columbia Records

Film and television 
"Date", an episode of the British sitcom Miranda
Dates (TV series), a British romantic drama series
"Dates" (Only Fools and Horses), a 1988 episode of the BBC sitcom

Places 
Date, Fukushima, Japan
Date District, Fukushima, Japan
Date, Hokkaido, Japan
Date, South Dakota, United States
Date City, California, United States
Dateland, Arizona, United States

Other uses
Date (surname), a family name in Japan and elsewhere, including a list of people with the name
Date clan, a Japanese samurai kin group
Design Automation and Test in Europe, a yearly conference on electronic design automation

See also 

Blind date (disambiguation)
Dating (disambiguation)
Double date (disambiguation)
Mystery Date (disambiguation)